Paul Comtois,  (August 22, 1895 – February 21, 1966) was a Canadian politician.

Born in Pierreville, Quebec, the son of Urbain Comtois and Elizabeth McCaffrey, he ran unsuccessfully for the House of Commons of Canada in the 1930 federal election and in a 1933 by-election. He was elected in 1957 election for the riding of Nicolet—Yamaska. A Progressive Conservative, he was re-elected in the 1958 election. From 1957 to 1961, he was the Minister of Mines and Technical Surveys. In 1961, he was appointed the 21st Lieutenant Governor of Quebec.

He served until 1966, when he was killed in a fire that destroyed his official residence. While trying to save the Blessed Sacrament from the private chapel, he was overcome by the flames. Unfortunately the only objects he was able to recover were cruets, presumably because he found the tabernacle was locked.

References

External links

 Assemblée nationale du Québec biography 

1895 births
1966 deaths
Lieutenant Governors of Quebec
Members of the House of Commons of Canada from Quebec
Members of the King's Privy Council for Canada
Progressive Conservative Party of Canada MPs
Deaths from fire
Accidental deaths in Quebec
People from Centre-du-Québec
Category:List of unusual deaths